Fatimid invasion of Egypt may refer to:
Fatimid invasion of Egypt (914–915)
Fatimid invasion of Egypt (919–921)
Fatimid invasion of 935, repulsed by Muhammad ibn Tughj
Fatimid conquest of Egypt (969)